Paths of Flame is a 1926 American silent film directed by Denver Dixon, and starring Art Mix, Dorothy Lee and Bill Patton. It premiered on July 2, 1926, in Poughkeepsie, New York.

References

American black-and-white films
Films directed by Victor Adamson